The 1998–99 season was Port Vale's 87th season of football in the English Football League, and fifth successive season in the First Division. It was the end of an era for the club, as manager of sixteen years John Rudge was sacked in January, and was replaced by Brian Horton. As a testament to the upheaval at the club, a club record 43 players turned out for the Vale in the league over the course of the season. The Vale just avoided relegation on goals scored, despite suffering a final day defeat to Bury, who were relegated having scored ten fewer goals. Liverpool knocked them out of the FA Cup at the Third Round, and Vale were also knocked out of the League Cup by fourth tier Chester City in the First Round. The sacking of Rudge spoiled what was supposed to be a happy season for Vale fans, as Vale competed in a division above rivals Stoke City for only the fourth time.

Overview

First Division
The pre-season saw John Rudge splash out £300,000 on Bristol Rovers forward Peter Beadle and £100,000 on Scunthorpe United defender Michael Walsh. He also signed Dave Barnett (Dunfermline Athletic); Brian McGlinchey and Paul Beesley (Manchester City); and John McQuade (Hamilton Academical) on free transfers. Stéphane Pounewatchy also became the first French player to play for the club when he was signed on a monthly contract from Dundee. Scott Mean was loaned to the club by West Ham United, though he went on to sustain a knee injury during his spell that would damage his career. Also Andy Clarke was signed on loan from Wimbledon.

The season started poorly with three defeats, Lee Hughes scoring a hat-trick for West Bromwich Albion to finish this run off. Two wins opened the month of September, though the month ended with former-Valiant Lee Mills scoring a brace for Bradford City in a 4–0 win over Vale at Valley Parade. In October, Derek McGill signed from Queens Park Rangers, though he would move on to Hamilton Academical later in the year. On 29 October, Gareth Ainsworth became Vale's biggest ever transfer as he was sold to Wimbledon for £2 million. In November, Robin Berntsen became the first Norwegian to play for the Vale when he arrived on loan from Tromsø IL. In addition to this French forward Christophe Horlaville joined on loan from Le Havre, and Des Lyttle also arrived on loan from Nottingham Forest. After winning the first four games in October, Vale then went on a streak of twelve defeats in fifteen games, though the sole victory of this run, a 1–0 win over Bury on 19 December, would prove to be crucial at the end of the season. The win was not enough for Rudge, who would get the sack in January after he made his final two signings: Trinidadian midfielder Tony Rougier from Hibernian for £175,000, and young striker Marcus Bent from Crystal Palace for a £375,000 fee. After Rudge was sacked by Chairman Bill Bell, highly distressed fans formed a "flat cap protest" (Rudge's headwear of choice) against the decision. Offered the role of Director of Football at the club, he instead took up the same position at rivals Stoke City. To replace him, Bell appointed experienced manager and former Vale player Brian Horton, paying Brighton & Hove Albion £80,000 in compensation.

In February, Peter Beadle was sold on to Notts County for £250,000, representing a £50,000 loss. The month of March saw Horton make his first signings as manager, bringing in five new faces: Dave Brammer (£300,000 from Wrexham); Tony Butler (£115,000 from Blackpool); Carl Griffiths (£100,000 from Leyton Orient); Alex Smith (£75,000 from Chester City); and Chris Allen (free from Nottingham Forest). This cost the club a total of £590,000. He also took in striker Alan Lee on loan from Aston Villa, and Craig Russell on loan from Manchester City. His changes finally paid off in April, as Vale went on a five-game unbeaten run. Their penultimate game was a 2–0 victory over QPR, meaning that a final day 1–0 defeat at fellow relegation candidates Bury was inconsequential.

They finished in 21st position with 47 points, ahead of Bury on goals scored, but behind both Portsmouth and Queens Park Rangers on goals scored. Had the goals difference rule been in effect then Vale would have been relegated instead of Bury. Crewe Alexandra finished three places and one position higher than the Vale. Vale suffered 25 defeats, more than any other club in the league, and only Grimsby and Bury had scored fewer goals. Player of the Year Martin Foyle was the club's top-scorer with nine goals, representing the lowest total tally for the club's top-scorer since 1964–65. Only Paul Musselwhite and Allen Tankard managed to hit forty appearances, as a club record 43 players managed to turn out for the club throughout the season.

At the end of the season there was a complete clear-out, with ten players leaving: ten-year club veteran Neil Aspin (Darlington); Dave Barnett (Lincoln City); Brian McGlinchey (Gillingham); John McQuade (Raith Rovers); Chris Allen (Stockport County); Rogier Koordes (TOP Oss); Jan Jansson (IFK Norrköping);  Paul Mahorn (Stevenage Borough); Stéphane Pounewatchy (Colchester United); and Paul Beesley (Blackpool).

Finances
The club's shirt sponsors were Tunstall Assurance.

Cup competitions
In the FA Cup, Vale hosted Premier League side Liverpool. The "Reds" left Burslem with a 3–0 victory, the goals scored by Michael Owen, Paul Ince, and Robbie Fowler.

In the League Cup, Third Division Chester City dispatched the Vale 2–1 at Vale Park, and held on to a 2–2 draw at the Deva Stadium to embarrass Vale fans with a minor giant-killing act.

League table

Results
Port Vale's score comes first

Football League First Division

Results by matchday

Matches

FA Cup

League Cup

Player statistics

Appearances

Top scorers

Transfers

Transfers in

Transfers out

Loans in

References
Specific

General
Soccerbase

Port Vale F.C. seasons
Port Vale